Interstate 687 (I-687) was a proposed auxiliary Interstate Highway in the Capital District region of New York in the United States. The highway would have connected I-90 in to I-87 and the Albany International Airport in Colonie. I-687 faced opposition from those living in the path of the highway, and ultimately all that was built of the highway was its interchange with I-90 in Albany, which now connects to a surface road, Corporate Woods Boulevard. The project was cancelled in 1973, and I-687 was removed from the Interstate Highway System four years later. A small portion of what would have been I-687 is now used as a connector between the Adirondack Northway and the Albany International Airport, however it does not have a route designation and was completed as its own separate project in November 2019.

Route description

I-687 was to begin between exits 24 and 25 on the New York State Thruway. It would continue north to a diamond intersection with NY-5 (Central Avenue). It would then proceed north and east to an exit with NY-155, and farther to an interchange with Interstate 88, via a connector running on the west side of the airport. I-687 would then have an entrance to the Albany International Airport, the main reason for its existence. Continuing east, I-687 would then have a cloverleaf interchange with Interstate 87 (the Adirondack Northway). Continuing east, I-687 would enter an interchange with a proposed northward extension of NY-85 (the Crosstown Arterial), serving as the northern terminus of NY-85. The highway would then curve southeast into a diamond interchange with Osborne Road. After one final interchange with Everett Road, I-687 would end at exit 5A on I-90, now not associated with the Thruway. This would also include an entrance and exit to North Manning Boulevard, for direct access to Downtown Albany.

History
The initial plans for the Capital District's portion of the Interstate Highway System were drawn up in the late 1950s. One of the highways proposed at this time was I-687, also known as the "Northway Connection". When the Adirondack Northway (I-87) was completed through Colonie in 1960, a gap was left in the Northway's exit numbering system for an interchange with I-687. The exits with NY 5 (Central Avenue) and Albany Shaker Road were designated as exits 2 and 4, respectively, leaving exit 3 for I-687. No such gap was left on the toll-free section of I-90, where the I-687 exit was numbered exit 5A.

The construction of I-687 would have forced hundreds of households from their homes, most of which are located off of Albany Shaker Road (NY-155 east of I-87). By way of comparison, today's Crossing Park in Colonie would have been directly in the path of the highway. As such, the project faced opposition from residents of the town of Colonie. The construction of the road was started despite the controversy surrounding it, and the interchange with I-90 was completed . Construction was halted soon afterward, however, as state and federal funds were diverted away from the project. I-687 and the proposed northward extension of the Crosstown Arterial (NY 85) were both cancelled by the state of New York in late September 1973, at which time the New York State Department of Transportation (NYSDOT) requested that I-687 be removed from the Interstate Highway System. The request was granted in 1977.

I-90 exit 5A, the only part of the project that was ever constructed, was left as an interchange to nowhere for roughly a decade. The North Manning Boulevard connection was never built. In the early 1980s, the large, freeway-standard trumpet interchange was linked up with Corporate Woods Boulevard, a local, two-lane street leading to an office park located just north of I-90 on Albany Shaker Road. The New York State Department of Transportation (NYSDOT) reconfigured the exit 4 and 5 ramps, which helped relieve traffic congestion in this area. On July 9, 2019, it was announced that the new airport connector will become exit 3. Exit 3 gives access to Albany International Airport,  exit 4 gives access to Wolf Road, and the exit 5 ramp southbound was realigned to meet directly with the Northway, instead of through the conjoined frontage road. Exit 4 will be relocated, and will become an access exit to Albany Shaker Road and Albany International Airport.

Current form
While the idea for I-687 is basically dead as of the end of 2019 with only an interchange to nowhere at exit 5A on I-90 built, a new exit 3 flyover ramp from I-87 (the Adirondack Northway) to NY 155 (Albany Shaker Road) called the Albany Airport Connector is currently in use where I-687 would have been built, providing an easier connection between the Northway and the Airport. The connector was completed in November 2019.

Exit list

Current

Original proposal
The original proposal would have had ten exits as follows:

See also

References

87-6
87-6
87-6
6
Transportation in Albany County, New York
Transportation in Albany, New York